The Northern Ireland Conservatives is a section of the United Kingdom's Conservative Party that operates in Northern Ireland. The party won 0.03% of the vote in the 2022 Northern Ireland Assembly election and 0.7% of the vote in the 2019 United Kingdom General election in Northern Ireland.

In 2009, the party entered an electoral alliance with the Ulster Unionist Party (UUP), whereby the two parties fielded joint candidates for elections to the House of Commons and the European Parliament under the banner of "Ulster Conservatives and Unionists – New Force". Literature and the website for the 2009 European Parliament election used "Conservatives and Unionists" as the short name. The alliance ended after the 2010 UK general election.

History

Before 1922
The Conservative Party was first represented in Ireland in the form of the Irish Conservative Party, which operated across the island. The Irish Conservatives became part of the Irish Unionist Alliance (IUA) in 1891. By this stage, the Conservative's electoral base was largely restricted to Ulster and Dublin. The IUA's Members of Parliament took the Conservative Party whip at Westminster, but the organisation retained a level of independence. Following the establishment of the Irish Free State in 1922, the IUA dissolved. Its successor in Northern Ireland was the Ulster Unionist Party (UUP).

1922–1972
From 1922, the Conservative Party maintained formal links with the UUP, its members taking the Conservative whip in the Parliament of the United Kingdom, much like the then-independent Unionist Party of Scotland, which integrated into the party in England and Wales in the 1960s. This relationship broke down in 1972, following Unionist opposition to the proposed Sunningdale Agreement, when all but one of the UUP MPs resigned the Conservative whip. The sole exception, Stratton Mills, left the UUP and continued to take the whip for a further year, before joining the Alliance Party of Northern Ireland. Another UUP MP, Robin Chichester-Clark, became Minister of State for Employment in the Conservative government from April 1972 to February 1974.

Entry into Northern Ireland
The Conservative Party did not organise in Northern Ireland until the late 1980s, when three Unionist members of North Down Borough Council, including George Green, defected to the party. The party doubled its representation there in the local government elections of 1989, becoming the largest party on the council. An Independent Conservative also won a seat on Lisburn Borough council, although he joined the UUP before the 1993 local elections. In the 1989 European Elections the Conservative candidate polled 4.8% and was just 2,000 first preference votes behind the Alliance Party candidate.

Subsequently, the Conservatives were boosted by a number of other defectors. Former UUP Assembly members Dorothy Dunlop and Billy Bleakes defected in Belfast and Lisburn respectively, while Robert Mitchell, a former Stormont MP, defected in Coleraine. Mary Ardill, wife of prominent former Stormont MP Austin Ardill, joined in Carrick; Gary Haggan defected from the Democratic Unionist Party (DUP) in Larne, and independent unionist and former DUP politician Billy Dickson in Belfast. Lloyd Hall-Thompson, another retired former UUP Stormont politician, became chair of the local Lagan Valley branch.

The 1992 general election saw the Conservatives stand in Northern Ireland for the first time. Laurence Kennedy came closest to winning a seat in North Down, finishing second behind James Kilfedder and gaining 32% of the vote.

Relationship with the Ulster Unionist Party
The Conservatives have for some time maintained a close relationship with the UUP. The former UUP leader and First Minister, David Trimble was elevated to the House of Lords on losing his Commons seat. Shortly after standing down from the Northern Ireland Assembly in 2007, he took the Conservative whip.  On doing so he made it clear that he would not be campaigning on behalf of the Northern Ireland Conservatives in opposition to his former party.

In July 2008 David Cameron and Sir Reg Empey announced a working group to develop a partnership with the UUP. This was implemented in 2009, forming the "Ulster Conservatives and Unionists" for certain electoral purposes, though the Vice Chairman of Conservatives NI, Jeffrey Peel, resigned from the Joint Committee created by both parties. Also, Lady Sylvia Hermon, the UUP MP for North Down, resigned the UUP whip in March 2010 in protest at the tie-up.

The two parties stood as the Ulster Conservatives and Unionists - New Force at the 2009 European Parliament election and 2010 UK General Election.

Relaunch as NI Conservatives

On 14 June 2012 the Conservatives in Northern Ireland were relaunched as NI Conservatives.  The party is now autonomous on devolved matters, although it remains a full part of the national Conservative and Unionist Party.  The party had a councillor on Larne Council, Dr Brian Dunn. Dunn was first elected as a UUP candidate in 2001, and was last elected as an independent before joining the Conservatives. He did not stand for re-election in 2014 due to health reasons. The party nominated Mark Brotherston as their candidate in the European Parliament elections in 2014, but he failed to be elected, coming last with 0.7% of first preference votes.

The party stood in 16 out of the 18 Northern Ireland constituencies at the 2015 general election, although most of their candidates were from outside Northern Ireland. Although the Conservative Party won a majority of seats UK-wide, the party received only 1.3% of the vote in Northern Ireland (9,055 votes) and failed to win any seats.

The party regained a council seat when former UUP Coleraine ex-Mayor and Causeway Coast and Glens councillor David Harding joined the party.

They stood 12 candidates in 11 of the 18 constituencies in the 2016 Assembly elections. They won no seats, with candidates obtaining between 0.1% and 2.1% of the first preference votes. They stood one candidate each in 13 of the 18 constituencies in the 2017 Assembly elections, but won no seats. The Northern Ireland Conservatives stood candidates in 7 of the 18 constituencies in the 2017 general election. They won a total of 3,895 votes and no seats.

The party nominated Amandeep Singh Bhogal as their candidate for the 2019 European Parliament election, but he was not elected, coming last with 662 first preference votes (0.12%).

Organisation

Chairman

People

As of the NI Conservatives AGM in November 2021, the members of the Executive Council are as follows:

 Chairman – Matthew Robinson
 Deputy Chairman (Political) – Vacant
 Deputy Chairman (Membership) – Barry Hetherington
 Treasurer – Frank Shivers
Constituency Officers and Representatives also sit on the Executive Council.

Policy
The party in Northern Ireland was largely opposed to the Good Friday Agreement, in contrast to the national leadership who were in favour.

Election results

The Northern Ireland Conservatives have a low support base, attracting 0.5% of the poll (3,500 votes) in the 2007 Assembly election.  , they have no elected representatives in the Northern Ireland Assembly, Local Government or Parliament.

The party's best performance came in the 1992 general election, when party candidates polled 44,608 votes across Northern Ireland: 5.7% of the total. Their best performance came in the North Down constituency, where the local party chairman, Laurence Kennedy, came second, 5,000 votes behind the sitting MP James Kilfedder.

Subsequently, the party declined rapidly. In the 1993 council elections, the party lost five council seats, being reduced to six councillors across Northern Ireland. In North Down, the party's support more than halved, from 25% in 1989 to 11% in 1993, although they narrowly managed to win a seat in all four North Down electoral areas. Laurence Kennedy quit Northern Irish politics a few months later, while the party's councillors in Lisburn and Carrick left the party to sit as Independent Unionists. In 1997 they were reduced to two council seats in North Down. Both councillors retired before the 2001 council elections and the party failed to defend one of their seats in 2001 with the other lost, leaving them without elected representation in Northern Ireland.

Westminster elections
For results of other NI parties which were affiliated historically with the Conservatives, see the following pages:
 1835–1886
 1892–1918
 1922–1974

Devolved legislature elections

Local government elections

European elections

See also

Scottish Conservatives
Welsh Conservatives
Labour Party in Northern Ireland

References

External links
 Official website of the Northern Ireland Conservatives

1980s establishments in Northern Ireland
Conservative parties in Ireland
Northern Ireland
Political parties in Northern Ireland